The 2007–08 Solomon Islands National Club Championship was the 5th season of the National Club Championship in the Solomon Islands. Koloale FC won the league for the second time. All matches were played at the hillside ground called Lawson Tama Stadium, with an approximate capacity of 20,000.

Teams 
 Banika Bulls
 Fasi Roos
 FK Kokohale FC
 Iceland Rovers
 Koloale
 KOSSA
 Lagoon Brothers FC
 Landowners FC
 Makuru
 Marist
 Uncles FC
 Vatu FC

Pools

Pool A

Pool B

Knockout stage

Semi-finals

Third place match

Final

References 

Solomon Islands S-League seasons
2007 in Solomon Islands sport
2008 in Solomon Islands sport